The 2015 Asian Wrestling Championships was held at the Aspire Dome Volleyball Hall in Doha, Qatar. The event took place from May 6 to May 10, 2015.

Medal table

Team ranking

Medal summary

Men's freestyle

Men's Greco-Roman

Women's freestyle

Participating nations 
256 competitors from 25 nations competed.

 (1)
 (1)
 (24)
 (3)
 (21)
 (16)
 (12)
 (24)
 (2)
 (24)
 (17)
 (15)
 (10)
 (6)
 (1)
 (5)
 (2)
 (22)
 (3)
 (11)
 (1)
 (8)
 (2)
 (20)
 (5)

References
Results Book

External links
UWW Official website
Organizers Official website

Asia
Asian Wrestling Championships
W
Wrestling Championships
Wrestling Championships
Wrestling in Qatar